The Direttorio Divisioni Superiori (Italian for Directory of Higher Divisions) was the ruling body of the major Italian football championships during the fascist era.

History
The Directory was established through the CONI by the fascists. Italy was turning into a dictatorship, and the government imposed the new system to the sport too. In 1926 the FIGC had huge problems of governance, and the authorities profited by the situation to disband the Leagues replacing them with appointed committees.

The Directory organized the first football at national level, abolishing the division between North and South, and it legalized the professional football. A new championship was created, the Divisione Nazionale, alongside the diminished Prima Divisione. The first one was divided between Serie A and Serie B in 1929, while the second one was substituted by the Serie C in 1935.

World War II interrupted the championships in 1943. At the fall of fascism in 1945, the Directory was automatically abolished. The Lega Calcio was created in its place in 1946.

DDS Chairmen
1926-1927 Ulisse Baruffini
1927-1934 Ottorino Barassi
1934-1936 Rodolfo Vecchini
1936-1940 Guido Cavalli
1940-1943 Federico Sani

See also
 Italian football league system
 Divisione Nazionale
 Coppa Italia

References

Serie A
Serie B
Serie C
1926 establishments in Italy
Football governing bodies in Italy
1945 disestablishments in Italy